Yury Anatoliyevich Filatov is the Russian ambassador to Ireland.

Skripal affair

As a result of the Skripal affair, Simon Coveney informed the ambassador that "the accreditation of a member of his staff with diplomatic status is to be terminated". The ambassador appeared on Claire Byrne Live and said that Ireland should put its own interests first, not those of another country and also said:

"The only thing I know for sure, from the onset of the whole incident on 4 March in Salisbury – the British Government has moved away from dealing with that in a responsible manner. So, they preferred to wage a propaganda campaign, unprecedented, surely."

2022 Russian military exercise controversy

During the controversy Ambassador Filatov met with members of the Irish South and West Fish Producers Organisation.

Russian-Ukrainian crisis

On 2 February 2022, Mr Filatov explained to an Oireachtas committee that there was an "almost daily drumbeat of so-called imminent Russian invasion of Ukraine" and stated there were no facts to support the invasion "fantasy". He said "The most pressing issue facing Russia, Europe and beyond is the threat to Russian national security resulting from the eastward expansion of NATO" and this "is unacceptable behaviour and has to be dealt with".

In an interview on 16 February 2022 with Prime Time Mr Filatov believed the idea that Russia would invade Ukraine was "insane". He dismissed the suggestion that stationing Russian troops around borders with Ukraine was an act of aggression or that Russia planned on invading Ukraine at that time. He said "We do not have any political, economic, military or [any] other reason to do that. The whole idea is insane. If you knew something about the Russian and Ukrainian people you would never ask such a question". He said the troops would have returned to normal duties in about three to four weeks.

On 24 February 2022, Russia invaded Ukraine. On 25 February 2022 Mr Filatov was questioned during an interview by David McCullagh on RTÉ News: Six One TV show, which received widespread praise.

On 29 March 2022 Mr Filatov was summoned to the Irish Department of Foreign Affairs and told of a decision to expel four senior diplomats from the Russian embassy, not including himself though. Mr Filatov did not object to this.

References

External links
 Yury Anatoliyevich FILATOV Ambassador Extraordinary and Plenipotentiary of the Russian Federation to Ireland - official webpage at the website of the Russian embassy in Ireland

1957 births
Living people
Russian diplomats
Ambassador Extraordinary and Plenipotentiary (Russian Federation)
Ambassadors of Russia to Ireland